Alexander Vlahos (born 30 July 1988) is a Welsh actor, writer, and director best known for playing Philippe, Duke of Orléans, in the Canal+ television series Versailles. In 2012, Vlahos took over from Asa Butterfield in the role of Mordred, for the BBC One drama Merlin.

Early life
Vlahos was born in Tumble, Carmarthenshire, before moving to Llantrisant, Mid Glamorgan. He is the son of a Greek father and a Welsh mother, and speaks both Welsh and English. He played ice hockey from ages eight to 18; for the Cardiff Devils, Great Britain and Captained Wales. His love for the sport derives from watching the Mighty Ducks as a young child and he remains a fan of the media franchise. He trained in acting at the Royal Welsh College of Music & Drama in Cardiff, graduating in 2009.

Career
He first appeared in the BBC Wales drama Crash in 2009, portraying Dylan. The following year, he appeared in the daytime medical soap opera Doctors in a week-long storyline entitled "Master of the Universe," in which he played the lead role of Lewis Cutler. The episodes were then nominated for "Best Single Episode" and "Spectacular Scene of the Year" at the British Soap Awards in 2010. Also in 2010, he appeared in both Pen Talar and The Indian Doctor, and the film Bright Lights.

In 2012, he earned the role of Private Keenan in Privates, a mini-television series about conscripts in the National Service set in the 1960s, for which he shaved his head. He also played the part of Mordred in series five of Merlin, a role originally played by Asa Butterfield in the first two series.

From 2012 to 2016, he played the role of Dorian Gray in Big Finish Productions' audio series The Confessions Of Dorian Gray. He has also written one of the episodes, "The Mayfair Monster," released in October 2013, and the audio play, HMS Surprise for the Bernice Summerfield box set New Frontiers, which was released in April 2013.

From 6 December 2013, Vlahos appeared in Fortune's Fool at The Old Vic. Mike Poulton's adaptation of Turgenev's play was directed by Lucy Bailey, in a new production which stars Iain Glen and Richard McCabe.

In July 2015, it was announced that he would be playing Bertie Potts in the mini audiobook series The Diary of River Song set in the Doctor Who universe, alongside Alex Kingston.

Since 2015, he portrayed Louis XIV's brother, Philippe I, Duke of Orléans, in the Franco-Canadian historical television series Versailles, about life at the French court, The first series premiered in November 2015. Series 2 was filmed in early 2016 and explores the lighter side to Philippe, the first time for Vlahos to portray a rather light-hearted character for an extended period of time. On 14 September 2016, producer Claude Chelli confirmed that Versailles has been renewed for a third season, which began filming in April 2017. In March 2018, Vlahos confirmed that the third season would also be Versailles''' final one.

In the 2016 docudrama Barbarians Rising, a global co-production for The History Channel, Vlahos played the Roman emperor Valentinian in one episode. He also portrayed the Romanian philosopher and mathematician Maurice Solovine in one episode of Genius, National Geographic Channel's first scripted series.

From 11 February to 11 March 2017, Vlahos starred in Max Gill's La Ronde, a modernised, gender-neutral version of the play by Arthur Schnitzler. A cast of four played the 10 characters randomly selected onstage every night by a roulette wheel. In the 2017 Big Finish Productions audio drama Hamlet, Vlahos played the title character.

In summer 2018, Vlahos played Romeo in Romeo and Juliet, and Catesby in Richard III at the Shakespeare's Rose Theatre in York, before returning to the Park Theatre in London to portray Captain Hook and Mr Darling in a stage production of Peter Pan''.

Filmography

Audiobooks

Theatre

References

1988 births
Alumni of the Royal Welsh College of Music & Drama
Living people
People from Llantrisant
Welsh male television actors
Welsh people of Greek descent
Welsh-speaking actors